At the Battle of Altafulla (24 January 1812), a Spanish division led by Joaquín Ibáñez Cuevas y de Valonga, Baron de Eroles clashed with an Imperial French division under the command of David-Maurice-Joseph Mathieu de La Redorte. Believing he faced only a single battalion, Eroles attacked in a heavy fog and was beaten by 8,000 French soldiers. The action occurred during the Peninsular War, part of the Napoleonic Wars.

Only the French commander, Jacques Mathurin Lafosse, and 22 dragoons escaped the debacle. Emboldened by his victory, Eroles decided to engage a French force six days later at Altafulla and suffered the loss of between 600 and 2,000 men. Uncowed by his defeat, Eroles repulsed Jean Raymond Charles Bourke's French force when it attacked him at Roda de Isábena on 5 March.

Forces
Mathieu's Imperial forces included three battalions of the French 3rd Light Infantry Regiment, one battalion each of the French 18th Light, 23rd Line, and 115th Line Infantry Regiments, two battalions of the Duchy of Nassau Infantry Regiment, and two companies of partisans. Baron de Eroles led 4,000 foot soldiers, 250 cavalry, and two artillery pieces. While Digby Smith asserted that Spanish losses came to 2,000 killed, wounded, and both guns. French losses were described as light. Charles Oman stated that Spanish losses amounted to 600 men and two guns.

Notes

References

External links
 

Battles of the Peninsular War
Battles of the Napoleonic Wars
Battles involving Spain
Battles involving France
Battles in Catalonia
Conflicts in 1812
January 1812 events